A cuban prime is a prime number that is also a solution to one of two different specific equations involving differences between third powers of two integers x and y.

First series 
This is the first of these equations:

i.e. the difference between two successive cubes. The first few cuban primes from this equation are

7, 19, 37, 61, 127, 271, 331, 397, 547, 631, 919, 1657, 1801, 1951, 2269, 2437, 2791, 3169, 3571, 4219, 4447, 5167, 5419, 6211, 7057, 7351, 8269, 9241, 10267, 11719, 12097, 13267, 13669, 16651, 19441, 19927, 22447, 23497, 24571, 25117, 26227 

This is exactly the general form of a centered hexagonal number; that is, all of these cuban primes are centered hexagonal.  

Second series 
The second of these equations is:

 

The first few cuban primes of this form are:

13, 109, 193, 433, 769, 1201, 1453, 2029, 3469, 3889, 4801, 10093, 12289, 13873, 18253, 20173, 21169, 22189, 28813, 37633, 43201, 47629, 60493, 63949, 65713, 69313  

The name "cuban prime" has to do with the role cubes (third powers) play in the equations.

See also 
Cubic function
List of prime numbers
Prime number

Notes

References 

Classes of prime numbers